Błyskawica - in Polish: lightning:
ORP Błyskawica - Polish destroyer
Błyskawica radiostation
Błyskawica submachine gun